The discography of Nickelback, a Canadian rock band, consists of 10 studio albums, two compilation albums, one extended play (EP), 44 singles, five video albums and 32 music videos. Formed in Hanna, Alberta in 1995 by Chad Kroeger, Ryan Peake, Mike Kroeger and Brandon Kroeger, the band issued its debut album Curb in 1996 through non-profit organization FACTOR, followed by a self-released follow-up The State in 1998. That year, Ryan Vikedal took over on drums after a brief tenure for Mitch Guindon. In late 1999 the group signed with Roadrunner Records, who issued The State internationally early the next year. The album reached number 130 on the US Billboard 200. Four singles were issued from The State, with the first three all registering on the US Billboard Mainstream Rock chart.

Nickelback's first new album for Roadrunner, 2001's Silver Side Up, was a worldwide commercial success which sold over 10 million copies and topped multiple album charts. Lead single "How You Remind Me" topped the Canadian and US singles charts. The 2003 follow-up The Long Road reached number 1 in Canada and number 6 in the US, selling over 5 million units worldwide. With new drummer Daniel Adair, Nickelback released its fifth album All the Right Reasons in 2005, which gave the band its first Billboard 200 number one. The album is the band's best-selling release to date with 18 million units sold worldwide, including 10 million in the US resulting in a diamond certification from the RIAA. Lead single "Photograph" reached number 2 on the Billboard Hot 100 and was certified double platinum.

Dark Horse, released in 2008, topped the Canadian Albums Chart and reached number 2 on the Billboard 200. It sold five million copies worldwide and spawned eight singles, two of which reached the Canadian Singles Chart top ten. Here and Now, the band's final album on Roadrunner, was also its last to reach number 1 in Canada. After signing with Republic Records, Nickelback released No Fixed Address in 2014, which was their first major label release not to top the Canadian Albums Chart when it peaked at number 2. Lead single "Edge of a Revolution" was also the band's last to top the Billboard Mainstream Rock chart. Three years later, the group issued Feed the Machine on BMG, which reached number 2 in Canada and number 5 in the US.

As of November 2019, the band has reportedly sold over 50 million albums worldwide.

Albums

Studio albums

Compilations

Extended plays

Singles

Promotional singles

Other charted songs

Videos

Video albums

Music videos

Other appearances

Footnotes

References

External links
Nickelback official website

Nickelback
Nickelback
Discography